Nicolai Berendt   (27 July 1826 – 1889) was a Danish pianist and composer.

He debuted as a pianist in November 1846 at the Royal Theater of Denmark with a piano concerto by Johann Nepomuk Hummel. In 1851–53, he studied composition and piano in Vienna and lived thereafter as the piano teacher and concert pianist in Hanover.

References

This article was initially translated from the Danish Wikipedia.

Male composers
Danish classical pianists
1826 births
1889 deaths
19th-century Danish composers
19th-century classical pianists
Male classical pianists
19th-century male musicians
19th-century musicians